Spye Park is a historic home located at White Plains, Charles County, Maryland, United States. It is a modestly scaled, -story, three-bay frame Colonial dwelling built about 1767. The house's present plan and appearance is the result of a series of 19th- and early-20th-century alterations to the original structure, which was a rectangular, one-room-deep building with end chimneys. Also on the property is a timber-framed tobacco barn, a former animal barn, a cornhouse, a poultry house/machine shed, and a wellhouse.

Spye Park was listed on the National Register of Historic Places in 1990.

References

External links
 including photo from 1978, at Maryland Historical Trust

Houses in Charles County, Maryland
Houses on the National Register of Historic Places in Maryland
Houses completed in 1767
1767 establishments in Maryland
National Register of Historic Places in Charles County, Maryland